Smouha Sporting Club, simply known as Smouha, is an Egyptian sports club based in Alexandria, Egypt. The club is mainly known for its professional football team, which currently plays in the Egyptian Premier League, the highest tier of the Egyptian football league system.

History and ownership 
Smouha SC was founded on 29 December 1949, named after the club's first president & founder Joseph Smouha. Joseph Smouha was a Jewish textile manufacturer, philanthropist, and property developer and designer.

Joseph Smouha was born on 1 January 1878 in Baghdad. In 1892, he moved to Manchester, England, where he became a successful cotton manufacturer, and in 1912, he became the first President of the St. Annes-on-the-Sea congregation. During World War I, he and his family made their fortune manufacturing army clothing for the British. In 1917, Smouha came to Alexandria at the behest of the British because of his close ties to His Majesty's government and its representatives in the Middle East, as well as his position as one of Lawrence of Arabia's backers. After the War, Smouha bought the marshes of Lake Hadara, some 700 acres of water and marshland. Beginning in 1924, the Smouha family operated a sort of privately owned regional development authority, first draining the marshes, then paving two-lane roads. An industrial zone sprang up near the Ford assembly plant already in the area. For residents' convenience, a golf course was built, along with tennis courts and a race tract. Tracts of land were sold to private investors who wanted to build their homes in the area, which rapidly turned into the most exclusive neighborhood in Alexandria. Mr. Smouha donated much of his property to schools, hospitals and other public institutions. The new suburban garden city became known as "Smouha City". During WWII, Smouha's three sons served in the RAF, and Smouha contributed heavily toward the purchase of Spitfire planes, the aircraft used in the first line of attack to protect Britain's skies. Due to threats from the Germans, the British Embassy ordered Smouha to leave Egypt. The family then moved to Ramallah, Palestine for six months, before returning to Egypt once more. During his negotiations for the swamp region, the Egyptian government initially offered to give the land to Smouha for very little to no money, while Smouha insisted on paying a fair fee. This fact later served the Smouha family well after the Nasser government confiscated Smouha City after the Sinai Campaign and refused to compensate the family. Joseph Smouha died on 25 September 1961 in Paris at age 83.

Engineer, millionaire, founder and chief executive of Faragalla Group, as well as parliament member Mohamed Farag Amer led Smouha Club from 1998 to 2021

Smouha Sporting Club 

When Joseph Smouha settled in Alexandria in 1923, he became interested in developing a wealthy suburb and turned to the 700 acres of water and marshland used as a garbage dump in Alexandria. Smouha eventually transformed this land into the wealthy neighborhood of Smouha City—so nicknamed by suggestion of former Egyptian King Faud. Among schools, hospitals, and wealthy neighborhoods with certain royal residents, the Smouha Sporting Club also inhabited Smouha City. The Smouha Sporting Club itself began with the spread of golf across Egypt. As golf became an increasingly played sport through the 1930s, Joseph Smouha planned the construction of an 18-hole golf course in Smouha City at the site of today's Smouha Sporting Club. The golf course was situated within the infield of a racetrack which Smouha had previously constructed. Interestingly, this golf course is renowned for having what is regarded as the best golf grass in the Arab world, as a result of its location above the swampland. The Smouha Sporting Club grew to include tennis courts along with the golf course and race track, and was formally established in 1949. Joseph Smouha was the first chief executive of the sporting club, and today the club remains open under the leadership of Engineer Mohammed Farag Amer. Although the Nasser regime confiscated Smouha City from the Smouha family in 1956, Joseph Smouha had donated much of the property to public institutions and the sporting club remained open. Currently, Smouha Sporting Club provides sportive, social, and cultural services to over 120,000 people—marking it as one of the largest sporting clubs in all of Egypt. The club is particularly famous for its football teams, but supports numerous individual and sports teams.

Recent additions and branches 
In 2007, the architectural firm Environmental Consulting Group (ECO Group) began designing new properties for the Smouha Sporting Club. Established in 1995, ECO Group is a Middle-Eastern firm of about 100 employees led by Professor Amr El-Sherif. Throughout its history, ECO Group has been involved in construction projects totally over US$300 million. ECO Group has developed the Smouha Sporting Club's club house, cafeteria, swimming pools, and facilities for children.

The club operates three branches as of 2021; Smouha branch, Burg El-Arab branch, and New Alamein City branch (under construction).

Football Club
Smouha has maintained a midtable club status and relative financial stability for most of its time in the Egyptian Premier League. Smouha finished in second place in the 2008–09 Egyptian Second Division season. They were close to being promoted to the Egyptian Premier League, but they lost their final match against Kafr El-Zayat, so El-Mansoura was promoted instead. In the 2009–10 Egyptian Second Division Smouha secured their first ever promotion to the 2010-11 Egyptian Premier League after a 7–1 win against Abu Qair Semad on 28 April 2010. The club was close to being relegated in the 2010–11 season. They had a good start in the 2012–2013 premier league season, defeating Cairo giant Al Ahly 1–0, Ghazl El Mahalla 5–1 and Wadi Degla 3–0.

Honours and achievements
Football Club

Domestic

League
Egyptian Premier League
 Runners up : 2013–14

Cup
Egypt Cup
 Runners up: 2014, 2017–18

Performance in CAF competitions
PR = Preliminary round
FR = First round
SR = Second round
PO = Play-off round

Season records
{|class="wikitable"
|-bgcolor="#efefef"
! Season
! Div.
! Pos.
! Pl.
! W
! D
! L
! GS
! GA
! Pts.
! style="width:15%;"|Egypt Cup
!colspan=2|Continental
|-
|align=center|2008–09
|align=center rowspan="1"|Second Division
|align=center|2 (Group C)
|align=center|30
|align=center|20
|align=center|7
|align=center|3
|align=center|59
|align=center|22
|align=center|67
|align=center|Second round
|align=center colspan="2"|-
|-
|align=center|2009–10
|align=center rowspan="1"|Second Division
|style="text-align:center; background:#00FF00;"|1 (Group C)
|align=center|30
|align=center|19
|align=center|8
|align=center|3
|align=center|60
|align=center|25
|align=center|65
|align=center|Second round
|align=center colspan="2"|-
|-
|align=center|2010–11
|align=center rowspan="1"|Premier League
|align=center|15
|align=center|30
|align=center|6
|align=center|10
|align=center|14
|align=center|33
|align=center|45
|align=center|28
|align=center|Round of 16
|align=center colspan="2"|-
|-
|align=center|2011–12
|style="text-align:center; background:#cd5c5c;" colspan="9"|Not finished
|style="text-align:center; background:#cd5c5c;" colspan="1"|Not held
|align=center colspan="2"|-
|-
|align=center|2012–13
|style="text-align:center; background:#cd5c5c;" colspan="9"|Not finished
|align=center colspan="1"|Round of 32
|align=center colspan="2"|-
|-
|align=center|2013–14
|align=center rowspan="1"|Premier League
|style="text-align:center; background:#CCCCCC;"|2
|align=center|23
|align=center|12
|align=center|6
|align=center|5
|align=center|30
|align=center|22
|align=center|42
|style="text-align:center; background:#CCCCCC;"|Runner up
|align=center colspan="2"|-
|-
|align=center|2014–15
|align=center rowspan="1"|Premier League
|align=center|10
|align=center|38
|align=center|14
|align=center|9
|align=center|15
|align=center|43
|align=center|37
|align=center|51
|align=center|Semi Final
|align=center|CL
|align=center|Group stage
|-
|align=center|2015–16
|align=center rowspan="1"|Premier League
|align=center|3
|align=center|34
|align=center|13
|align=center|16
|align=center|5
|align=center|45
|align=center|37
|align=center|55
|align=center|Quarter Final
|align=center colspan="2"|-
|-
|align=center|2016–17
|align=center rowspan="1"|Premier League
|align=center|5
|align=center|34
|align=center|15
|align=center|12
|align=center|7
|align=center|49
|align=center|40
|align=center|57
|align=center|Semi Final
|align=center|CC
|align=center|Group stage
|-
|align=center|2017–18
|align=center rowspan="1"|Premier League
|align=center|5
|align=center|34
|align=center|14
|align=center|9
|align=center|11
|align=center|37
|align=center|26
|align=center|51
|style="text-align:center; background:#CCCCCC;"|Runner up
|align=center colspan="2"|-
|-
|align=center|2018–19
|align=center rowspan="1"|Premier League
|align=center|12
|align=center|34
|align=center|8
|align=center|14
|align=center|12
|align=center|33
|align=center|41
|align=center|38
|align=center|Round of 16
|align=center colspan="2"|-
|-
|align=center|2019–20
|align=center rowspan="1"|Premier League
|align=center|5
|align=center|34
|align=center|11
|align=center|18
|align=center|5
|align=center|44
|align=center|33
|align=center|51
|align=center|Round of 16
|align=center colspan="2"|-
|-
|align=center|2020–21
|align=center rowspan="1"|Premier League
|align=center|4
|align=center|34
|align=center|12
|align=center|18
|align=center|4
|align=center|54
|align=center|41
|align=center|54
|align=center|Round of 16
|align=center colspan="2"|-
|-
|}

Current squad

Managers

 Rabie Yassin (1 July 2006 – 30 June 2007)
 Mimi Abdel Razek (July 2007 – 1 May 2010)
 Mohsen Saleh (18 May 2010 – 6 August 2010)
 Patrice Neveu (6 August 2010 – 21 November 2010)
 Hamza El-Gamal (21 November 2010 – 27 May 2011)
 Shawky Gharieb (1 November 2011 – 20 July 2013)
 Hamada Sedki (July 2013 – Oct 2014)
 Denis Lavagne (Oct 2014 – Dec 2014)
 Helmy Toulan (June 2015 – July 2015)
 Mimi Abdel Razek (July 2015)
 Mohamed Youssef (July 2015 – 1 November 2015 )
 Mimi Abdel Razek (2 November 2015 – 2016)
 Helmy Toulan (June 2016 – July 2016)
 Jorvan Vieira (2016)
 Helmy Toulan (2016)
 Moamen Soliman (2017)
 Frantisek Straka (2017)
 Talaat Youssef (2018)
 Mimi Abdel Razek (2018) (caretaker)
 Ali Maher (2018)
 Tarek Yehia (2018–2019)
 Adel Abdelrahman (2019) (caretaker)
 Hossam Hassan (2019–2020)
 Hamada Sedki (13 January 2020 – 6 September 2020)
 Ahmed Samy (6 September 2020 – 2 May 2022)
 Abdel Hamid Bassiouny (3 May 2022 – 2 September 2022)
 Tarek El Ashry (4 September 2022 – 25 January 2023)
 Ahmed Samy (26 January 2023 – present)

References

External links
 

 
Football clubs in Alexandria
Multi-sport clubs in Egypt
Association football clubs established in 1949
1949 establishments in Egypt
Egyptian field hockey clubs